The Hal Rogers Parkway, formerly named the Daniel Boone Parkway, connects Somerset and Hazard in southeastern Kentucky. This toll road opened in November 1971, and the tolls were removed June 1, 2003. The original extent of the highway was to be  with that mileage to have been included with an unconstructed limited-access London bypass and what is east of this area. The original portion of the road is designated unsigned Kentucky Route 9006 (HR 9006).

Route description
Per the Kentucky Transportation Cabinet (KYTC), the Hal Rogers Parkway begins in Somerset, Pulaski County, at the intersection of US 27 and KY 80 north of downtown area. The highway heads east as a four-lane divided highway with a concrete median and turning lanes provided at the at-grade intersections through the northern neighborhoods of the city. Passing the eastern terminus of KY 914, the median becomes grass and eventually exits the city limits of Somerset for a more rural area of Pulaski County. After its intersection with KY 461 near Shopville, the Parkway narrows to an undivided highway with two lanes and occasional turning and passing lanes provided. As it enters the Daniel Boone National Forest, the highway winds its way around small mountain valleys. Crossing the Rockcastle River into Laurel County, the highway heads a straighter course through the small mountains. Before exiting the national forest, the highway widens to a four-lane divided highway again with the number of commercial businesses located around the highway increasing as it heads east. After entering the city of London, the Parkway passes many intersections for minor state highways before interchanging with Interstate 75 (I-75) at its exit 41 around many traveler-related businesses. After the interchange, a center turn lane is provided along the highway to serve additional businesses and side streets.

Upon reaching its intersection with US 25, KY 80 exits the Parkway while the Parkway alone (unsigned HR 9006) continues east as a four-lane undivided highway with a center turn lane. East of KY 30/KY 354 and the North Laurel High School, the parkway narrows to two lanes and features a few more at-grade intersections near downtown London. Past KY 192, the Parkway becomes a two-lane expressway featuring a mix of at-grade intersections, overpasses without access, and interchanges. In Hazard, the Parkway intersects three local streets at-grade before terminating at an interchange with KY 15 and KY 80.

History

As a toll road
The then-Daniel Boone Parkway, as with all eight of the other parkways, was originally a toll road from its 1971 opening until 2003.

Toll removal and renaming 
By Kentucky state law, toll collection ceases when enough toll has been collected or funds received from other sources, such as a legislative appropriation, to pay off the construction bonds for the parkway.

The toll booths were dismantled soon after the tolls were removed on June 1, 2003, and new Hal Rogers Parkway signs replaced the Daniel Boone Parkway signs sometime later in the same year. The two at-grade toll booths at exits 34 and 44 were converted into regular intersections and the mainline toll booth near London was dismantled. It is the only parkway in the state of Kentucky to be almost exclusively two-lanes with the occasional truck lanes on the hills. There is a center paint divider with rumble strips added as a safety feature.

The only at-grade intersections are located at exit 34 and 44 in Clay and Leslie counties, respectively, along with the stretch of parkway from the western terminus at US 25 to KY 192, totaling  in Laurel County, and from milepost 58 to exit 59 in Perry County near Hazard.

Renaming controversy and 2015 extension
U.S. Representative Hal Rogers was the forerunner in getting the tolls lifted on the Daniel Boone Parkway, securing $13 million in federal funding. Former governor Paul E. Patton, to thank him for removing the tolls on the highway, renamed the Daniel Boone Parkway the Hal Rogers Parkway. This stirred a lot of controversy among Kentucky residents and descendants of Daniel Boone who were offended that a parkway originally named for the famous pioneer, who helped settle Kentucky, was renamed for a sitting congressman whose main accomplishment was getting the tolls lifted off of the parkway. Soon after, the Associated Press picked up the controversy regarding the renaming of the parkway and outrage over the renaming has been heard across the United States and as far as the United Kingdom.

On October 14, 2015, at a surprise ceremony attended by Rogers, Governor Steve Beshear and KYTC officials renamed a  stretch of KY 80 between Somerset and London as an extension of the Hal Rogers Parkway. Somerset was the residence of Rogers at the time of the renaming. The road had been named the Russell Dyche Memorial Highway for a London newspaperman and politician.

Major intersections

References

External links

 Hal Rogers Parkway at KentuckyRoads.com
 Photographs of the Hal Rogers Parkway at H.B. Elkin's Millennium Highway

9006
Two-lane freeways in the United States
Kentucky parkway system
Interstate 66